Ice Nine Kills (sometimes stylized in all capital letters or abbreviated to INK, and formerly known as Ice Nine) is an American heavy metal band from Boston, Massachusetts, who are signed to Fearless Records. Best known for its horror-inspired lyrics, Ice Nine Kills formed in its earliest incarnation in 2000 by high school friends Spencer Charnas and Jeremy Schwartz. Charnas is currently the only remaining founding member.

Ice Nine Kills has released three EPs along with six full-length studio albums: Last Chance to Make Amends, Safe Is Just a Shadow, The Predator Becomes the Prey, Every Trick in the Book, which peaked at number 122 on the US Billboard 200; The Silver Scream, which peaked at number 29; and their latest, The Silver Scream 2: Welcome to Horrorwood which peaked at number 18 on the US Billboard 200;. Their band name is derived from the fictional substance ice-nine from the novel Cat's Cradle by Kurt Vonnegut.

History

2000–2009: Formation and Last Chance to Make Amends 
Ice Nine Kills was founded in 2000 under the name "Ice Nine" by high school friends Spencer Charnas and Jeremy Schwartz, before later recruiting drummer Grant Newsted in 2003 and swapped out their then-bassist (Patrick Morse) for Hobie Boeschenstein in 2004, but changed their name to Ice Nine Kills just before releasing their debut independent album Last Chance to Make Amends on April 20, 2006. However, they did record a demo, entitled "The Pop-Punk-Ska Years", in 2002, which would eventually be released in 2009.

The following year on November 20, 2007, Ice Nine Kills released their EP The Burning through Red Blue Records. The band then set out on several national tours in support of the EP, including opening slots on tours with I See Stars and Eyes Set to Kill among others. By 2008, the group had been invited to open for well-known acts such as As I Lay Dying, A Day to Remember, Thursday, Paramore and a one-off performance on the Taste of Chaos 2009 tour. That same year, Ice Nine Kills released 2 acoustic tracks ("The Simple Act of Giving Up" and "Lifetime in a Week") on an EP titled 2 Song Acoustic.

In mid-2009, Schwartz decided to leave the band after struggling with life on the road, leaving Charnas as the only original member. Charnas then recruited former members of the Rochester NY based post-hardcore band Remember Tomorrow which had recently disbanded and stopped playing rhythm guitar. This shifted Ice Nine Kills' sound into more of an experimental metalcore sound to which Ferret Music took notice and signed the band in the spring of 2009 and after their appearance on Warped Tour 2009 the band began writing and recording their next record.

2010–2013: Safe Is Just a Shadow and The Predator 

Ice Nine Kills released their second full-length album Safe Is Just a Shadow on July 12, 2010. Vocalist Dave Sieling, who has since left the band, contributed clean vocals along with Spencer Charnas. The album received praise from heavy metal magazine, Revolver in the 2010 Hottest Chicks in Rock Issue and subsequently the band was invited to attend the Revolver Golden Gods awards in Los Angeles CA on April 20, 2010. The band supported Safe Is Just a Shadow with a two-week appearance on Warped Tour 2010, and a supporting slot with Michigan-based nu metal band Taproot. The band performed on a headlining tour in the summer of 2011 as well as a performance at the Darien Lake NY stop of Warped Tour 2011 on the Dzambo Stage. The band released a music video inspired by the film Inglourious Basterds for their song "The People Under the Stairs".

On May 12, 2012, it was announced that the band would be the opening act for the 2012 edition of The All Stars Tour featuring Suicide Silence, The Word Alive, Dance Gavin Dance, I See Stars, and Attila. 
On November 22, 2012, Ice Nine Kills released an official lyric video for their new single "The Coffin is Moving". On that same date, they launched a Kickstarter campaign to raise money to fund their new EP. On December 22 the band announced that they had raised over $21,000 for their Kickstarter campaign and that their new EP The Predator would be released on January 15, 2013. To celebrate this announcement they released a second single from the EP entitled "What I Never Learned In Study Hall" featuring guest vocals from Tyler Carter vocalist of Issues. The acoustic version of the song was released on January 8 on the Take Action compilation volume 11 via Hopeless Records.

The band's second EP entitled The Predator was released on January 15, 2013, and debuted at No. 9 on the Billboard Heatseekers chart.

On April 26, 2013, the band released a stand-alone single called "The Product of Hate", the song was released as a fundraising way to help the victims of the Boston Marathon bombing.

On July 9, 2013, the band released the official video for the song "The Coffin Is Moving".

On November 4, 2013, the band released a new single titled, "Connect the Cuts".

2014–2015: The Predator Becomes the Prey 

On January 8, 2014, the band released the second single from their forthcoming album, "The Power in Belief". Ice Nine Kills released their third studio album The Predator Becomes the Prey on January 21 through the newly created Outerloop Records, an imprint of Fearless Records. The album marks the band's first entrance into the Billboard Top 200 charts landing at No. 153. The album also debuted at No. 3 on the top heatseeker's chart, No. 38 on the independent label chart, and No. 13 on the Hard Rock charts.

On February 26, 2014, it was revealed that Ice Nine Kills would be performing on the Monster Energy Stage for the entire Warped Tour 2014.

On February 27, 2014, Ice Nine Kills Released a music video for "Let's Bury the Hatchet... In Your Head". On February 6, 2015, Ice Nine Kills released a music video for "The Fastest Way to a Girl's Heart Is Through Her Ribcage". On February 19, 2015, Ice Nine Kills released a new song called "Me Myself & Hyde" from their new album scheduled for fall of 2015. From April 30 – May 22, Ice Nine Kills Headlined the IX Lives Tour with Get Scared, Upon This Dawning, Chasing Safety, and Brightwell. On June 22, 2015, Ice Nine Kills released a music video for their version of "Animals" by Maroon 5 on Fearless Records for Punk Goes Pop Vol. 6.

2015–2018: Every Trick in the Book and Safe is Just a Shadow re-release

On September 17, 2015, the band signed to Fearless Records who released their album Every Trick in the Book. The lead single and music video, "Bloodbath & Beyond" was released on September 25. The second single, "Communion of the Cursed", was released on October 22. The music video was a 'shortened remake' of The Exorcist. Every Trick in the Book was released on December 4, 2015.

Alongside other newly signed Fearless Records artist Wage War and The White Noise, the band headlined on the "Fresh Faces Tour" from October 24 – November 29, 2016.

Ice Nine Kills released a re-recorded version of their 2010 album Safe Is Just a Shadow on January 6, 2017. Vocalist Spencer Charnas described the reasoning, stating, "With the evolution of our skills as musicians, and the original producer, Steve Sopchak, having established himself at the top of his craft, we felt this was a perfect time to re-record the album and give it that extra attention that it always deserved."

In March 2017, they released a music video for "The Nature of the Beast" inspired by the book Animal Farm. Additionally, the band was featured on the Fearless Punk Goes Pop series Punk Goes Pop 7 covering "I Don't Wanna Live Forever" originally by Zayn and Taylor Swift on July 14, 2017. Afterwards, the band toured with Motionless in White and Chelsea Grin, while working on their upcoming studio album.

On June 14, 2018, drummer Conor Sullivan announced that he was leaving the band to pursue different musical projects. Former Affiance drummer Patrick Galante will serve as a touring member.

2018–present: The Silver Scream series

On June 20, 2018, Ice Nine Kills released "The American Nightmare", the first single from their fifth studio album The Silver Scream. It was accompanied by a music video inspired by the film A Nightmare on Elm Street (1984). The Silver Scream was released on October 5, 2018, and marked the band's highest chart debut to date. The album scanned almost 19,000 copies in its first week, landing the band their first top 10 records on the billboard top album chart. It features thirteen songs inspired by thirteen separate horror films.

In an interview with Wall of Sound on September 24, 2018, Spencer Charnas revealed the band collaborated with Less Than Jake on the song "It is the End", which is based upon and inspired by the two theatrical film adaptations of Stephen King's 1986 epic supernatural horror novel It. Less Than Jake provided the brass instrument section of the song to give it a "sinister, carnival, circus vibe" The album also features a track called "Rocking the Boat", in which the band namedrops all of their previous releases and former singer Jeremy Schwartz makes a guest appearance.

On January 1, 2019, former bassist Shane Bisnett died at age 31. Frontman Spencer Charnas revealed the news via Instagram sharing a video and anecdotal story about his former bandmate who recorded bass on the band's 2010 album Safe Is Just a Shadow. Lead guitarist Justin DeBlieck released a tribute song named "Sunrise" under the moniker Fallbrook.

On March 23, their bassist Justin Morrow parted ways with the band, joining Motionless in White. The band wrote "We are excited for Justin and wish him nothing but the best" and announced Joe Occhiuti as a permanent replacement. Justin DeBlieck was also not present on the first two tours of 2019 while he was producing the new Motionless in White album, Disguise.

On September 13, 2019, the band released an acoustic rendition of their hit song, "Savages". On September 24, the band released their final music video for the Silver Scream completing the storyline they had started with "The American Nightmare" with the release of a music video for the final track on the album, "IT is the End".

On October 4, 2019, the band released the acoustic version for their song, "Stabbing in the Dark" featuring Matt Heafy of Trivium. The band's reissue of The Silver Scream, dubbed the "Final Cut", was released on October 25. The reissue featured the band covering Michael Jackson's hit song, "Thriller" and a song about the Scream horror series.

On May 9, 2020, the band recorded a parody version of "Stacy's Mom" by Fountains of Wayne entitled "Jason's Mom", inspired by Friday the 13th (1980), in celebration for the day of the film's 40th anniversary. The song was released a year later on May 7, 2021.

On June 24, 2020, the band posted on their socials a link to a maze game to "unlock the secret". The landing page of the link states they will be releasing Undead & Unplugged: Live From the Overlook Hotel on June 26, 2020.

On October 30, 2020, the band released I Heard They KILL Live!!, a live album recorded at the Worcester Palladium. The release also had an accompanying The Silver Stream livestream. The Silver Stream mixed live footage from the 19-track set with a self-produced horror movie framing device, featuring the band members and Bill Moseley. The horror movie aspect of The Silver Scream was helmed by Spencer Charnas and director Myles Erfurth of Stained Glass Eye Entertainment.

The band also announced Inked in Blood, a tie-in graphic novel to The Silver Scream planned for release on April 21, 2021. The graphic novel was written by Steve Foxe and illustrated by Giorga Sposito & Andres Esparza.

The band released a cover and music video of the Elvis Presley song "Can't Help Falling in Love" on February 9, 2021, to the Fearless Records YouTube channel. The title of the new album was listed in the credits as The Silver Scream 2: Welcome to Horrorwood. On the ninth of each month leading up to the album's release, a new single and accompanying video was released to promote the album. On July 9, 2021, the band released the lead single from the album "Hip to Be Scared", inspired by American Psycho. The single features Papa Roach frontman Jacoby Shaddix, and was released along with an accompanying music video. On August 3, 2021, the band released a teaser video featuring the album's track listing, leading fans to predict and speculate the horror/thriller movies that inspired the songs on the album. On August 9, 2021, the band released the second single "Assault & Batteries", inspired by Child's Play. On September 9, 2021, the band released the third single "Rainy Day", inspired by Resident Evil. On October 9, 2021, the band released the fourth single "Funeral Derangements", inspired by Pet Sematary. The album was released on October 15, 2021. Four months after the album had released, the band released the fifth single from the record, "Take Your Pick" featuring George "Corpsegrinder" Fisher, taking cinematic inspiration from My Bloody Valentine and being released on February 14, 2022 for Valentine's Day alongside an animated music video.

On March 31, 2022, the band released a new song, "Hunting Season", taken from The Fall Of Troi expansion of the video game, PUBG: New State.

On July 29, 2022, the band released an acoustic rendition of the track "The Shower Scene" from Welcome to Horrorwood: The Silver Scream 2.

Musical style
The group originally pursued a style of ska-punk influenced by alternative rock, ska, and pop punk, but they have since shifted into a style which has been described as metalcore, post-hardcore, heavy metal, melodic hardcore, symphonic metal, and horror punk. Ice Nine Kills has described itself as "theatricore."

Ice Nine Kills' songs have also been categorized under a variety of genres outside their primary sound, including hard rock, post-metalcore, emo pop, deathcore, technical death metal, psychobilly, pop punk, hardcore punk, death metal, symphonic death metal, industrial metal, melodic metalcore, and Neue Deutsche Härte.

Band members

Current members
Spencer Charnas – lead vocals, keyboards (2000–present); additional guitar (2019–present); rhythm guitar (2000–2009)
Patrick Galante – drums (2018–present)
Ricky Armellino – rhythm guitar, backing vocals, keyboards, programming (2019-present)
Joe Occhiuti — bass, keyboards, backing vocals (2019–present)
Dan Sugarman — lead guitar, backing vocals (2019–present)

Touring members
Chris Kelly — lead guitar, backing vocals (2021–2023)
Chris Laplante — lead guitar, backing vocals (2021)
Terrence Donnelly - rhythm guitar  (2009-2010)

Former members
Andrew Justin Smith – bass, backing vocals (2002–2004)
Hobie Boeschenstein – bass, backing vocals (2004–2008)
Grant Newsted – drums (2003–2008)
Dave Marvuglio – bass (2008–2009)
Jeremy Schwartz – co-lead vocals, lead guitar (2000–2009)
Dave Sieling – co-lead vocals (2009-2010)
Shane Bisnett (died 2019) – bass (2009–2011); co-lead vocals (2009–2011); backing vocals (2009)
Steve Koch – bass, co-lead vocals (2011–2013)
Conor Sullivan – drums (2009–2018)
Justin Morrow – bass (2013–2019); rhythm guitar (2009–2018); backing vocals (2009–2019)
Joseph Merturi – lead guitar (2008)
Justin "JD" DeBlieck – co-lead vocals, lead guitar, keyboards, programming (2009-2019)

Timeline

Discography

Last Chance to Make Amends (2006)
Safe Is Just a Shadow (2010)
The Predator Becomes the Prey (2014)
Every Trick in the Book (2015)
The Silver Scream (2018)
The Silver Scream 2: Welcome to Horrorwood (2021)

References

External links

 

2002 establishments in Massachusetts
Metalcore musical groups from Massachusetts
Fearless Records artists
Hardcore punk groups from Massachusetts
Heavy metal musical groups from Massachusetts
Musical groups established in 2002
Musical quintets
Ferret Music artists